Gerard Escoda Alegret (born 8 September 1970) is an Andorran alpine skier. He competed at the 1988, 1992, 1994 and the 1998 Winter Olympics.

Notes

References

External links
 
 

1970 births
Living people
Andorran male alpine skiers
Olympic alpine skiers of Andorra
Alpine skiers at the 1988 Winter Olympics
Alpine skiers at the 1992 Winter Olympics
Alpine skiers at the 1994 Winter Olympics
Alpine skiers at the 1998 Winter Olympics
People from Escaldes-Engordany